Heywoodia is a genus of plants in the Phyllanthaceae first described as a genus in 1907. It contains only one known species, Heywoodia lucens, native to eastern, southeastern, and southern Africa (Kenya, Uganda, Tanzania, Mozambique, KwaZulu-Natal, Eswatini, Cape Province).

References

Phyllanthaceae
Phyllanthaceae genera
Monotypic Malpighiales genera
Flora of Africa